Burnetiamorpha is a clade of biarmosuchian therapsids. Burnetiamorphs are the most derived biarmosuchians. The name Burnetiamorpha has been in use since South African paleontologist Robert Broom erected the group in 1923, but it has recently been put to use in phylogenetic classification as a clade including Burnetiidae and its closest relatives, including Lemurosaurus, Lophorhinus, and Lobalopex.

Phylogeny
Below is a cladogram modified from Sidor and Smith (2007) showing the phylogenetic position of Burnetiamorpha among biarmosuchians:

References

 
Guadalupian first appearances
Lopingian extinctions
Fossil taxa described in 1923
Taxa named by Robert Broom